Rycroft is a village in northern Alberta, Canada. Dunvegan Provincial Park is located 20 km north of the community.

The post office was originally known as Spirit River.  The name was changed to Roycroft in 1920 to honour R.H. Roycroft, a prominent local citizen, and was altered to Rycroft in 1933.

Demographics 

In the 2016 Census of Population conducted by Statistics Canada, the Village of Rycroft recorded a population of 612 living in 274 of its 316 total private dwellings, a  change from its 2011 population of 628.

See also 
List of communities in Alberta
List of villages in Alberta
Peace Country

References

External links 

1944 establishments in Alberta
Municipal District of Spirit River No. 133
Villages in Alberta